The Tiro de Diu is a 16th-century siege cannon, specifically a large-calibre basilisk, which saw action in the First Siege of Diu in 1538.

History 
The Tiro de Diu was cast in bronze in 1533 during the reign of Sultan Bahadur Shah of Gujarat and was used during the First Siege of Diu in 1538.

The basilisk is cast in one solid piece and has no ornaments whatsoever except for some laudatory Arabic inscriptions that can be roughly translated as follows:

From our Lord the Sultan of Sultans of all ages; life-giver of the tradition of the Prophet of the Merciful God; the one that fights for the exaltation of the precepts of the Koran; the destroyer of the arguments of the supporters of wickedness; the one that casts away the houses of worshipers of idols; the Victor of the day when the two armies will meet; heir to the kingdom of Solomon; the one who trusts in the God the Benefactor; the possessor of all the virtues – Bahadur-Shah

After the defeat of the Muslim forces, the gun was sent to Lisbon, first being set in the Castle of São Jorge and, after 1640, in the Fortress of S. Julião da Barra, in Oeiras, to defend the mouth of the River Tagus.

By mid 18th century the gun was again removed, this time being sent to the Arsenal in Lisbon to be melted so that the metal could be used to cast a statue of king D. José I. However, a scholar noticed the Arabic inscriptions on the gun and after discovering the historical value of the piece, the gun was spared.

It is now on display on the Pátio dos Canhões at the Military Museu of Lisbon.

See also 
List of the largest cannon by calibre

Notes

Sources 
Jorge Santos Alves (dir.), " Fernão Mendes Pinto and the Peregrinação", Fundação Oriente/INCM, Vol. 1 Studies (2010), p. 33
A Alma e a Gente http://www.rtp.pt/rtpi/images/articles/246/MundodosHerois.pdf
 Diccionario Geográphico Abreviado de Portugal e suas Possessões Ultramarinas (p. 103) https://archive.org/stream/diccionariogeogr00mara/diccionariogeogr00mara_djvu.txt

External links

Large-calibre artillery
Individual cannons